Mark Katz may refer to:

Mark Katz (speechwriter) (born 1963), American speechwriter and author
Mark N. Katz (born 1954), American academic
Mark Katz (musicologist)